The 1946 season was the thirty-fifth season for Santos FC.

References

External links
Official Site 

Santos
1946
Santos